State Route 26 (abbreviated SR 26) is part of Maine's system of numbered state highways. SR 26 runs in Cumberland, Androscoggin and Oxford Counties.

History 
The number 26 dates back to 1922 when the New England road marking system was adopted, although Maine did not officially join until 1925. The road was designated as New England Route 26, also known as the Dixville Notch Way, and largely occupies the same routing as it does today.

Route description

SR 26 begins in Portland. State route logs show its southern terminus at the intersection of Cumberland Avenue and Washington Avenue in the eastern end of the city center. It heads north on Washington Avenue. In the field, the southern terminus is signed at the intersection of Congress Street, Washington Avenue, and Mountfort Street in the eastern end of the city center, one block south of the Cumberland Avenue intersection with Washington Avenue. From here, SR 26 follows Washington Avenue northward and joins with I-295 / US 1 over Tukey's Bridge, splitting off immediately on the other side of the bridge to continue northwest on Washington Avenue.  SR 100 joins at Allen Avenue, and the two routes turn north onto Auburn Street and continue together as far as the town of Gray.  En route, the highway passes through the town of Falmouth, paralleling Interstate 95 (the Maine Turnpike) for the entire 13-mile (21 km) stretch.

In Gray Village, SR 26 and SR 100 intersect with US 202, SR 4 and SR 115 with SR 100 splitting off. The Turnpike begins to turn northeast at Gray, as does SR 100, but SR 26 continues north and then northwest.  SR 26 continues north through New Gloucester and Poland, where it intersects SR 11 before passing the Poland Spring Resort.  SR 26 continues through western Mechanic Falls, Oxford (where it briefly overlaps with SR 121), eastern Norway and Paris (where it overlaps with SR 117). SR 26 starts to turn northwest as it continues through West Paris and Woodstock en route to Bethel, where it has an interchange with US 2 and SR 5 located near the northern terminus of SR 35.  At this interchange, SR 26 turns northward along US 2 and SR 5, forming a three-route concurrency spanning 6 miles (9 km).  Immediately after crossing into the town of Newry, SR 26 splits off to the northwest.  The highway's northern reaches are in an isolated, mountainous region of the state.  After leaving Newry, the highway passes through Grafton Notch State Park, located in the unorganized territory of North Oxford.  SR 26 continues through the town of Upton before crossing into Cambridge, New Hampshire, where the highway continues as NH 26 westbound.

History

Sabbathday Lake/Shaker Village bypass
In 1988, the first attempt was made to modify the existing routing of a 5.25-mile (8.45 km) stretch of SR 26 in the towns of Gray and New Gloucester.  The existing roadway ran northward from Gray, hugging the Sabbathday Lake and then passed directly through the Shaker Village en route to New Gloucester, along current Shaker Road and Sabbathday Road.  This, along with a second attempt in 1989, was rejected due to disagreement among the public and town officials of how the plan ought to be executed.

Plans were resurrected in 1996 with the formation of a Public Advisory Committee of thirteen members, composed of local citizens, local/regional government officials, and residents of the Shaker Village.  Together, the PAC confirmed the existing deficiencies of the road, in particular a section locally known as the "Seven Deadly Curves."   This section of the road was notorious for hazardous driving conditions due to lack of shoulders and small lane widths, numerous tight corners, and greatly varied speeds among vehicles traveling along the road.  Other deficiencies were also addresses, such as hazards to pedestrians, truck noise and excessive vehicular traffic passing through the Village, and storm/lake water quality concerns.

Several new alignments were proposed for the project, the eventual winner being a southern bypass of the Sabbathday Lake area combined with a northern bypass of the Shaker Village.  Two new segments of roadway were to be constructed as part of this new bypass.  Environmental clearance was obtained in November 1998, with construction completed by the fall of 2004.

The bypass begins north of Gray, where Shaker Road (SR 26) meets Sabbathday Road. Truck lanes were added on uphill climbs to improve traffic flow, and connecting roads from SR 26 provide access to the Sabbathday Lake area. Upon passing west of the lake, SR 26 rejoins its old alignment along former Sabbathday Road, which now dead-ends at its north end. Truck lanes are present on this section of road as well.

The SR 26 designation was removed from Shaker Road and Sabbathday Road, which now dead-end and do not directly connect to the bypass.  The bypass is known as Maine Street and carries a speed limit of 55 MPH.

Southern terminus
There is discrepancy between the signed and administrative southern termini of SR 26 in Portland. The signed southern terminus is located at the intersection of Washington and Congress Streets. However, the administrative terminus is located at Cumberland Avenue and State Street (SR 77) considerably further west. This means that instead of proceeding to the end of Washington to end at Congress, southbound SR 26 actually turns right onto Cumberland Avenue and continues southwest as to end at State Street.  This discrepancy is due to SR 26 having a historical southern terminus at US 1, which formerly occupied a surface alignment in downtown Portland before being re-routed along I-295 in 2007.  After US 1 was removed from Congress Street, SR 26 was administratively extended to connect to SR 77 (State Street) instead, but signage was not updated to reflect this change.  Similar discrepancies exist for the eastern termini of SR 22 and SR 25 for the same reason.

Junction list

State Route 26A

State Route 26A (SR 26A) is a  bypass of SR 26 opened in 2006 to alleviate congestion in the center of Gray Village where US 202, SR 4, SR 26, SR 100, and SR 115 intersect. Much of the traffic congestion at this village center intersection was due to traffic on SR 26 being forced to pass through this central intersection when accessing and leaving I-95 (Maine Turnpike), which has an interchange just  to the west. With the bypass, Turnpike traffic to or from points north of Gray no longer has to pass through the village center.

The southern terminus of SR 26A is at the intersection of US 202, SR 4, SR 26, SR 100 and SR 115.  SR 26A is cosigned with US 202, SR 4, and SR 115 westbound past the exit 63 Turnpike interchange before turning northward and running parallel to the Turnpike.  The highway rejoins SR 26 just south of the Gray-New Gloucester High School. In recognition of the heavy traffic flow of Turnpike access, it is SR 26 traffic which must yield at this junction, while traffic flow onto and from the SR 26A bypass continues smoothly and unimpeded here.

The Northbrook Business & Technology Park is located on SR 26A.

Junction list

References

External links

Floodgap Roadgap's RoadsAroundME: Maine State Route 26
Floodgap Roadgap's RoadsAroundME: Maine State Route 26A

026
Transportation in Portland, Maine
Transportation in Cumberland County, Maine
Transportation in Androscoggin County, Maine
Transportation in Oxford County, Maine
West Paris, Maine